Holliday Hydroelectric Powerhouse and Dam, also known as Holliday Station, is a historic powerhouse and dam located on the White River near Noblesville in Noblesville Township, Hamilton County, Indiana.  It was built in 1922, and includes a one-story Châteauesque style powerhouse building and a concrete dam measuring 10 feet high and 345 feet long. The powerhouse measures 26 feet wide and 40 feet long and is constructed of stone with a slate roof.

It was listed on the National Register of Historic Places in 1995.

References

Dams on the National Register of Historic Places in Indiana
Châteauesque architecture in the United States
Dams completed in 1922
Buildings and structures in Hamilton County, Indiana
National Register of Historic Places in Hamilton County, Indiana
Gravity dams
Industrial buildings and structures on the National Register of Historic Places in Indiana